Amy Sheppard is an Australian singer-songwriter and along with her siblings George and Emma, is a forming member of indie pop band Sheppard. She released her debut extended play, Nothing But Wild in September 2022.

Career

2009–present: Sheppard

2019–present: Solo career and Nothing but Wild
After attended the CMC Rocks Festival in Ipswich in 2019, Amy began exploring country music. Speaking to Pario in 2022, Amy said, "I'm a huge fan of country music. We grew up listening to a lot of country music. In fact, I was hearing that music when I was learning how to song write so I've always had a lot of country influences." Amy added after she "somewhat lost her identity as an individual to the band" she wanted to rediscover who she is an artist. She said "My whole adult life has been Sheppard and building this amazing career that we have managed to build up. This solo project is actually forcing me to take a deep dive into discovering who I am as an individual, which I think is going to be a huge learning curve for me. But I am looking forward to going on the journey."

Amy's debut solo single, "Nothing but Wild" was released on 21 April 2022. Amy said "'Nothing But Wild' explores my innate desire to regularly escape the city in order to reconnect with my wild side and natural surroundings."

On 5 August 2022, Amy released her second solo single "Blue Guitar" and announced the release of her debut EP, Nothing but Wild. Nothing but Wild debuted at number 16 on the ARIA Charts.

Discography

Extended plays

Awards and nominations

APRA Awards
The APRA Awards are presented annually from 1982 by the Australasian Performing Right Association (APRA).

! 
|-
|rowspan="2"| 2014 || rowspan="2"| "Let Me Down Easy" (Jay Bovino, Amy Sheppard, George Sheppard) by Sheppard || Most Played Australian Work ||  || 
|-
| Pop Work of the Year ||  || 
|-
|rowspan="3"| 2015 || rowspan="3"| "Geronimo" (Jason Bovino, Amy Sheppard, George Sheppard) by Sheppard || Most Played Australian Work ||  || 
|-
| Pop Work of the Year ||  || 
|-
| Song of the Year ||  || 
|-
| 2016
| "A-Grade Playa" (Jason Bovino, Amy Sheppard, George Sheppard) by Sheppard
| Song of the Year
| 
|  
|-
|rowspan="2"| 2019 || rowspan="2"| "Coming Home" (Jason Bovino, Amy Sheppard, George Sheppard, Matthew Radosevich, Christopher Wallace) by Sheppard || Most Played Australian Work ||  ||
|-
| Pop Work of the Year ||  ||
|-

Country Music Awards of Australia
The Country Music Awards of Australia is an annual awards night held in January during the Tamworth Country Music Festival. Celebrating recording excellence in the Australian country music industry. They commenced in 1973.
 

! 
|-
| 2023 || "Something Good's Gonna Happen"  (The Wolfe Brothers featuring Amy Sheppard) (Directed by Jay Seeney) || Video of the Year ||  || 
|-

References

Living people
Australian country singers
Australian women singers
Musicians from Queensland
APRA Award winners
Year of birth missing (living people)